Banigochha (also romanized as Baniguchha) is a village in Odisha.

Villages in Nayagarh district